The 2021 Calabrian regional election took place in Calabria, Italy, on 3 and 4 October 2021, following the dissolution of the regional parliament after the death of regional president Jole Santelli. It was originally scheduled to take place on 14 February 2021, then on 11 April 2021, and was delayed due to the COVID-19 pandemic in Italy.

Electoral system
Even if a district list is linked to a regional list that exceeds 8% of the vote, the district list must obtain at least 4% of the vote in the whole region in order to elect their own representatives. To ensure governance, the candidate who receives the most votes wins a majority bonus of 55% of the seats.

Parties and candidates
This is a list of the parties, and their respective leaders, which will participate in the election.

Potential candidates
Centre-left coalition: Jasmine Cristallo, Anna Falcone Pietro Grasso, Marco Minniti, Franco Mirabelli, Antonio Viscomi.
Centre-right coalition: Sergio Abramo, Fulvia Caligiuri, Gianluca Gallo, Maria Limardo, Mario Occhiuto.
Five Star Movement: Nicola Morra.

Withdrawn candidates
Centre-left coalition: Nicola Irto, Maria Antonietta Ventura.

Opinion polls

Candidates

Parties

Results

References

Elections in Calabria
2021 elections in Italy
October 2021 events in Italy
Elections postponed due to the COVID-19 pandemic